Andrew Lawrence Somers (March 21, 1895 – April 6, 1949) was an American businessman, World War I veteran, and Democratic politician who served 13 terms as a U.S. Representative from New York from 1925 until his death in 1949.

Biography 
He attended St. Teresa's Academy in Brooklyn, Brooklyn College Preparatory School, Manhattan College, and New York University in New York City.
He engaged in dry color and chemical business.

Military service 
During World War I, he enlisted on July 18, 1917, as a hospital apprentice, second class, in the United States Naval Reserve Force.

Subsequently, he served as an ensign in the Naval Reserve Flying Corps and was then appointed a naval aviator on September 17, 1918. He proceeded to foreign service on September 30, 1918, and served there until honorably discharged on March 4, 1919.

In January 1942, he submitted a resolution in the House of Representatives calling on President Roosevelt to petition Great Britain "to take such action as may be necessary to permit the organization of all-Jewish military units in Palestine".

Death 
Somers died on April 6, 1949, at age 54.

See also

 List of United States Congress members who died in office (1900–49)

References

General references
 

1895 births
1949 deaths
20th-century American politicians
Democratic Party members of the United States House of Representatives from New York (state)
Manhattan College alumni
Military personnel from New York City
Politicians from Brooklyn
Politicians from Queens, New York
United States Navy personnel of World War I
United States Navy reservists